Jimmy Wang may refer to:

Jimmy Wang (actor) (born 1943), Taiwanese actor, director, producer, and scriptwriter
Jimmy Wang (tennis) (born 1985), tennis player, who previously played under the name Wang Yeu-tzuoo
Jimmy Wang (journalist), freelance video and film producer

See also
James Wang (disambiguation)
James Wong (disambiguation)
Jimmy Wong (born 1987), American actor and musician
James Yang (born 1981), wrestler who uses the ring name Jimmy Wang Yang